Neroberg is a hill in Wiesbaden in Hesse, Germany. It offers a panoramic view of the city and is therefore a tourist destination, reached by the historic Nerobergbahn, a funicular railway from the Nerotalanlagen.

Hills of Hesse
Tourist attractions in Wiesbaden
Geography of Wiesbaden
Mountains and hills of the Taunus